QwaQwa Radio (Qwa-Qwa Radio 100.3FM) is a South African community radio station based in the Free State.

Coverage areas 
QwaQwa
Kestel
Harrismith
Bethlehem, Free State
Phutaditjhaba

Broadcast languages
English
SeSotho

Broadcast time
24/7

Target audience
LSM Groups 3 - 8

Programme format
60% Talk
40% Music

Listenership Figures

Location
The station's physical address is:
Witsieshoek, Phuthaditjhaba

References

External links
 Official Website
 SAARF Website

Community radio stations in South Africa
Mass media in the Free State (province)